Eddy Bosnar (born 29 April 1980) is an Australian professional footballer  centre back who last played for National Premier Leagues side Sydney United. He has scored numerous goals for his clubs with his free kicks.

Club career
After graduating from the Australian Institute of Sport Football Program, Bosnar began his professional career in 1997 with Newcastle Breakers. After staying in Australia for a few seasons with Northern Spirit and Sydney United, Bosnar moved to Croatia in 2000 to play with Dinamo Zagreb. After three years in Austria with Sturm Graz, Bosnar moved to England to play with Everton, but he failed to make an appearance in the Premier League for Everton, and he was released after one season due to injury. Bosnar then returned to old club Dinamo Zagreb, before briefly playing with Rijeka. Bosnar moved to the Netherlands in 2006 to spend two seasons with Heracles Almelo, before moving to Japan in 2008 with JEF United Chiba. He moved to Shimizu S-Pulse in 2010. Bosnar left Japan at the end of that season and joined Suwon Samsung Bluewings in the K-League. On 18 July 2013, Bosnar transferred to Chinese Super League side Guangzhou R&F.

On 1 February 2014, Bosnar signed with Central Coast Mariners until the end of May of that year. On 10 November 2015, Bosnar was released from his contract eight months early, after the player fell out of favour with Mariners coach Tony Walmsley.

Bosnar returned to Sydney United in February 2016, fifteen years after last playing for the club.

International career
Bosnar has represented Australia at all youth team levels including captaining the Joeys. He also represented Australia at the 1999 FIFA World Youth Championship, making three appearances.

Personal life
Bosnar is of Croatian origin.

His two younger brothers Milan and Ivan were also soccer players.

Bosnar, along with his brothers Milan, Ivan and Marko, run the Australian franchise of Croatian bakery "Mlinar" in Western Sydney.

Honours
Sydney United
Waratah Cup: 2016

References

External links
 
 
 Oz Football

1980 births
Living people
Association football central defenders
Soccer players from Sydney
Australian people of Croatian descent
Australian soccer players
Australia youth international soccer players
Australia under-20 international soccer players
Australian expatriate soccer players
Australian expatriate sportspeople in Croatia
Australian expatriate sportspeople in Austria
Australian expatriate sportspeople in England
Australian expatriate sportspeople in the Netherlands
Australian expatriate sportspeople in South Korea
Expatriate footballers in Croatia
Expatriate footballers in Austria
Expatriate footballers in England
Expatriate footballers in the Netherlands
Expatriate footballers in Japan
Expatriate footballers in South Korea
Expatriate footballers in China
National Soccer League (Australia) players
Croatian Football League players
Austrian Football Bundesliga players
Eredivisie players
J1 League players
K League 1 players
Northern Spirit FC players
Sydney United 58 FC players
GNK Dinamo Zagreb players
SK Sturm Graz players
HNK Rijeka players
Everton F.C. players
Heracles Almelo players
JEF United Chiba players
Shimizu S-Pulse players
Suwon Samsung Bluewings players
Guangzhou City F.C. players
Central Coast Mariners FC players
A-League Men players
Chinese Super League players
Australian expatriate sportspeople in Japan